Tkuma (lit. Resurrection) is a religious moshav in southern Israel. Located north-west of Netivot, it falls under the jurisdiction of Sdot Negev Regional Council.

History
Tkuma was established as a kibbutz on the night of 5 and 6 October 1946 as one of the 11 points in the Negev at a location around a mile from the present site. The first residents were Jewish immigrants from Eastern Europe, who survived the Holocaust, and the village's name reflects the resurrection of Israel.

In 1949 the village moved to its present location near the site of the depopulated Arab village of al-Muharraqa. Scholar Benny Morris documents that Tkuma is near the al-Muharraqa site, but writer Walid Khalidi says that Tkuma, although only 2 km west of the al-Muharraqa site, is on land which once belonged to the city of Gaza.

In the 1950s the moshav was joined by more immigrants from Eastern Europe and Tunisia.

Located 5 kilometers from Gaza, the moshav has suffered damage from rockets launched by Hamas militants during 2000s and 2010s. The moshav is serviced by the Color Red alert system.

Economy
Since the 1990s, fish-farming has been an important economic branch. The sale of fresh fish to banquet halls and restaurants in the northern Negev has provided income for seven families.

References

External links
Tkuma Negev Information Centre

Moshavim
Former kibbutzim
Religious Israeli communities
Populated places established in 1946
Gaza envelope
Populated places in Southern District (Israel)
1946 establishments in Mandatory Palestine